Penthouse Players Clique was an American hip hop duo that consisted of rappers Playa Hamm (born Wilbert Bryan Milo) and Tweed Cadillac. They were signed to Eazy-E's Ruthless Records, for which they released their debut and only album to date, Paid the Cost, in 1992. Paid the Cost featured production by DJ Quik, and guest verses by Quik, Eazy-E and AMG. The group appeared on the soundtracks to films Class Act and Trespass. The group's two members reunited in 2001 for Playa Hamm's debut solo album Layin' Hands, specifically on the tracks "Break the Bank" and "Grindin'". Tweed Cadillac released his own solo debut, "Toast 2 Tha Foolz", in 2007.2014 Tweed Cadillac released a Double CD titled Age Dont Count In The Booth...released exclusively @ tweedcadillac.com, in 2014 Tweed Cadillac Appeared on (The Midnight Life)CD  Produced by D.J.Quik`ft Suga Free.Tweed Cadillac also is the Host of an internet Radio Show 93.Tweed Fm (Izum) Thursday Nights 7-9pm pacific blogtalkradio.com/93tweedfm Playa Hamm & Tweed Cadillac also appeared on TVOne Unsung Episode with D.J.Quik 2014. Tweed Cadillac received a Legend award at The Westcoast Hip-Hop Awards in Oakland Ca, 2017

Discography

Studio albums

Singles
"They Don't Know"/"Droppen Bombs" (1990)
"Explanation of a Playa" (1992) - #50 on the Hot Rap Songs
"P.S. Phuk U 2" (1992)

Solo projects

Playa Hamm
 Layin' Hands (2001)
The Boss Playa Project with Bossolo (2011)

Tweed Cadillac
Toast 2 Tha Foolz (2007)
The Presidential Pimp Squad: Pearl Tongue (2012)
Age Dont Count in the Booth (2014)

References

External links
 Penthouse Players Clique at Discogs

Hip hop groups from California
Ruthless Records artists
Hip hop duos
American musical duos
Gangsta rap groups
Musical groups from Los Angeles